Praise My Day is Perseo Miranda's sixth album, released December 15, 2009 on Erga Editions.

The album was recorded at Music Art studios (Italy) on September–October 2009.

Track listing

 Praise My Day  part 1
 Praise My Day  part 2
 In This World part I  part 1
 In This World part II – (strumentale)
 Class of Words 		
 Shock Arms 
 Praise My Day  part 3
 Praise My Day  part4
Load

External links

 Perseo Miranda official website
 Perseo Miranda official Myspace site

2009 albums
Perseo Miranda albums